In November 2003, the Union for Reform Judaism (URJ) passed a resolution concerning medical cannabis at its general assembly in Minneapolis. The resolution became the first endorsement of medical cannabis by any religious body.

Roots 
The measure was preceded by a 1999 resolution adopted by Women of Reform Judaism, under the leadership of board member Jane Marcus.  Marcus, who contributed to the passage of the 2003 resolution by the full denomination and became a founding board member of the Interfaith Drug Policy Initiative, described her motivation: "A beloved friend from my synagogue contracted HIV from a blood transfusion. She was down to 85 pounds and had no desire for food.  Marijuana brought back her appetite and extended her life for three years. That’s when I started asking myself, why is this illegal?"  The Women of Reform Judaism resolution was possibly influenced by Beth Am Women of Los Altos Hills, California who successfully introduced a resolution at Pacific District of Women of Reform Judaism's San Jose, California convention in 1999 preceding the 1999 national convention.

Commentary 

According to Carol Saline, "Jews have been in the forefront of the effort to legalize medical marijuana, perhaps because of what Rabbi Dayle Friedman attributes to the 'strong mandate about healing in Judaism.'"

Footnotes

References

Sources

External links
Resolution: "The Medicinal Use of Marijuana", Union for Reform Judaism

2003 in cannabis
Cannabis and Judaism
Medicinal use of cannabis
Union for Reform Judaism